Buckeye Industries, also called Buckeye Aviation, was an American aircraft manufacturer, based in Argos, Indiana. The company was one of the leading manufacturers of powered parachutes and also produced some models of ultralight trikes.

One model, the single-seat Buckeye Eagle, could be flown as either a powered parachute or equipped with a hang glider-style wing and flown as an ultralight trike.

Aircraft

References

Defunct aircraft manufacturers of the United States
Ultralight trikes
Powered parachutes